Live in France is the third live album by Mexican guitar duo Rodrigo y Gabriela.  It was recorded at various dates in France on their 11:11 world tour.  It was released on 19 July in the United States and 25 July in the rest of the world.

Track listing

Personnel
Rodrigo y Gabriela
Rodrigo Sánchez – acoustic guitar
Gabriela Quintero – acoustic guitar

Production
Rodrigo y Gabriela – production
Naoto Tanemura – mixing
Ray Staff – mastering
Arno Paul – photography
Rod Maurice – front cover photo
Kmeron – back cover photo

References

Rodrigo y Gabriela albums
2011 live albums